Elsi Naemi Borg (October 3, 1893 – December 30, 1958) was a Finnish architect.

Life
She was born in Nastola and died in Helsinki. She graduated from Helsinki University of Technology in 1919.

She designed the infamous children’s hospital Children's Castle in Helsinki and the Taulumäki Church in Jyväskylä. She worked with Olavi Sortta to design the military hospital in Viborg. Her brother was architect Kaarlo Borg. She is also the sister of graphic artist Esther Borg and Parliament member Margit Borg-Sundman.

Sources
Henttonen, Maarit: Elsi Borg, 1893–1958, arkkitehti. Suomen Rakennustaiteen Museo, 1995. 
“BLF.” Accessed October 26, 2021. https://www.blf.fi/artikel.php?id=7791.
“Taulumäki Church · Finnish Architecture Navigator.” Accessed October 26, 2021. https://finnisharchitecture.fi/taulumaki-church/.
Tyvelä, Hanna. “Sukupuolittuneita Näkymiä = Gendered Perspectives on Architectural Practice.” Arkkitehti 116, no. 2 (January 1, 2019): 41–45.

References

External links
 

1893 births
1958 deaths
People from Nastola
People from Häme Province (Grand Duchy of Finland)
20th-century Finnish architects
Finnish women architects